2000 AD The Ultimate Collection is a fortnightly partwork collection of hardback books published by Hachette Partworks. The series is made up of 180 volumes featuring some of the biggest stars of 2000 AD’s 46-year history. The spine art on the books combine to display a new image by artist Boo Cook.

The series is the second collaboration between Hachette Partworks and 2000 AD publisher Rebellion Developments, following the success of Judge Dredd: The Mega Collection. It is available in the UK, Ireland and Australia.

List of books

The following books are those confirmed by Hachette. "Issue" refers to the order of publication, and "Volume" refers to the order in which the books are intended to be kept once the 180-volume collection is complete.

Notes

Issues not formally confirmed by publisher
Although no formal list of the complete collection was published, the official Facebook page answered questions regarding which characters will be included, and confirmed that the series would be released in reading order, though not each series in sequence, as is common with Partwork collections.

References

External links

Partworks
2017 comics debuts
Comic book collection books
2000 AD comic strips